List of Korean musicians may refer to:
 List of North Korean musicians
 List of South Korean musicians